The  is the 34th edition of the Japan Academy Film Prize, an award presented by the Nippon Academy-Sho Association to award excellence in filmmaking. It awarded the best films of 2010 and it took place on February 18, 2011 at the Grand Prince Hotel New Takanawa in Tokyo, Japan.

Nominees

Awards

References

External links 
  - 

Japan Academy Film Prize
2011 in Japanese cinema
Japan Academy Film Prize
February 2011 events in Japan